Paldi is an area located in South Western Ahmedabad, India. Corporate offices and city centres of many national and international companies like ICICI Bank, Royal Bank of Scotland, Religare,  Claris, Gujarat Gas are located within Paldi. It accommodates Sanskar Kendra museum by the renowned architect Le Corbusier as well as Tagore Memorial Hall. The National Institute of Design is located in Paldi.  M K Gandhi's first ashram in India, Kochrab Ashram is also located in Paldi. This area has many houses of the Art Deco period.

Religious places
 Bawa Tawakkal Dargah
 Shahi Masjid
 Mazar of Ali Sher Bengali
 Dharnidhar Jain Derasar
 Jalaram Mandir
 Mahalaxmi Temple
 Sai Baba Temple

Education
 Amrit Jyoti High School
 Ankur School
 Diwan Ballubhai School
 Little Flower School
 Mahavir Vidyalaya
 National Institute of Design
 Navchetan High School
 P T College
 Pulkit School
 Sadhana School
 Sharda Mandir School
 Shri Rambali Vidhayamandir
 Smt NHL Medical College
 Trinity English School
 V R Shah School
 Vandana Vidhya Vihar
 Nirman High School

Hospitals
 AIMS Hospital
 Aneri Eye Hospital
 ESI Dispensary
 Indian Red Cross Society, Ahmedabad
 Long Life Hospital
 Sanjivani Hospital
 Shubham Maternity Hospital                                           * Shaurya Hospital
 Dr Harshil Zaveri's Smile Care Dental Clinic
 Bodyline Hospital

Transportation
 Ahmedabad Railway Station is approximately 7 km from Paldi.
 Gujarat State Road Transport Corporation Bus Station, Gita Mandir is approximately 2 km from Paldi.
 Sardar Vallabhbhai Patel International Airport is approximately 16 km from Paldi.

Hotels	
 Le Grande	
 Hotel Platinum Inn	
 The Westend, Ahmedabad
 Hotel Riverfront, Ahmedabad
 Hotel Heritage	
 Hotel Skylon
Welcomheritage Mani Mansion heritage hotel

Restaurants/Cafes	
 Honest
 Subway (One and only pure veg. outlet in the world, also serving jain	
 Cafe Coffee Day 
 Udipi Cafe
 U S Pizza

References 

Neighbourhoods in Ahmedabad